The XVIII International Gold Cup was a non-championship Formula One race, and also a round of the European Formula 5000 Championship, held on 22 August 1971 at Oulton Park.

Eight Formula 1 cars turned up, with a full complement of F5000 cars making up the rest of the grid. Peter Gethin set pole position for the first heat, which was won by Henri Pescarolo. The grid for the second heat was arranged according to the finishing order of the first heat. John Surtees took the lead from Pescarolo and held it to the end, setting fastest lap, and a new circuit record, in the process. His win and his third place in the first heat made him the aggregate winner, just ahead of Howden Ganley.

Frank Gardner was the highest F5000 finisher in both heats, his performance being good enough for third overall.

Qualifying

Classification

References
 
 
 
 

1971 Formula One races
August 1971 sports events in Europe